So Vile a Sin is an original novel written by Ben Aaronovitch and Kate Orman and based on the long-running British science fiction television series Doctor Who. It features the Seventh Doctor, Chris and Roz, Bernice, Jason, Kadiatu Lethbridge-Stewart. It is the conclusion of the "Psi Powers series" and the last appearance of Roz Forrester.

Synopsis
'If you step into history,' said the Doctor, 'I won't be able to protect you.'
'This isn't history,' said Roz. 'This is family.'

The Earth Empire—the Imperium Humanum, upon which a thousand suns never set—is dying.

The Great Houses of the Empire manoeuvre and scheme for advantage; alliances are made; and knives flash in the shadows. Out among the moons of Jupiter, another battle is just beginning, as an ancient brotherhood seeks limitless power and long-overdue revenge.

The Doctor returns to the thirtieth century, searching for the source of a terrifying weapon. He fears a nightmare from his own past may be about to destroy the future. Nothing must be allowed to get in his way.

But the Doctor has reckoned without the power of history—which has its own plans for the wayward daughter of the House of Forrester.

Background
The novel was originally announced as being written only by Aaronovitch, but due to a hard drive crash on his computer it was delayed and taken on by Orman to complete. Originally to have been published in November 1996, it did not eventually appear until May 1997. This made it the last of the published New Adventures novels featuring the Doctor, although in terms of the ongoing narrative of the series it was followed by the five books published immediately previously to it, hence being numbered as 56 of 61.

The title is taken from William Shakespeare's Henry V, Act 2, scene iv.  It is the Dauphin's line "Self-love, my liege, is not so vile a sin/As self-neglecting."

External links
The Whoniverse's review on So Vile a Sin

1997 British novels
1997 science fiction novels
Virgin New Adventures
British science fiction novels
Novels by Ben Aaronovitch
Novels by Kate Orman
Seventh Doctor novels